Pseudocyphellaria argyracea is a species of foliose lichen in the family Peltigeraceae. It was first scientifically described in 1822  by Dominique François Delise. Edvard Vainio transferred it to the genus Pseudocyphellaria in 1898.

Description

Pseudocyphellaria argyracea has a foliose thallus that ranges from rosette-forming to irregularly spreading. Its upper surface features  white soralia and pseudocyphellae, while the pseudocyphellae and  margins bear simple to coralloid isidia.

Habitat and distribution

From East Africa to India, Japan, New Zealand, South America, and the Pacific islands, Pseudocyphellaria argyracea has a broad distribution in the Palaeotropics.

References

argyracea
Lichens described in 1822
Lichen species